Woof is a software application used to build a Puppy Linux distribution from another Linux distribution. This application must be run inside Puppy Linux, and an internet connection is required in order to download the other Linux distro's binary packages.

The CD-Remaster program available in Puppy Linux can be used to build variants of the Puppy Linux distribution.

In 2013, Woof was forked to Woof-CE, which uses a git version control system hosted on GitHub.

Build process
The process used by Woof to build a Puppy Linux distribution from another Linux distribution:
 The user selects the Linux distribution to be used as the foundation of the Puppy Linux distribution
 The user selects the choice of packages and other options
 The user initiates the build process
 If needed for the selected Linux distribution, the scripts perform preprocessing tasks
 The scripts download the package database files of the selected Linux distribution
 The scripts download the package files of the selected Linux distribution
 The scripts build the generic Puppy-packages
 The scripts build the Puppy Linux live-CD .iso file of the Puppy Linux distribution
 The user burns the Puppy Linux live-CD from the .iso file
 If desired, the user builds a new variant of the Puppy Linux distribution using the CD-Remaster tool available in Puppy Linux

Supported distributions
The Linux distributions that Woof can use as the foundation for a Puppy Linux distribution:

 Debian
 Slackware
 Ubuntu

References

External links

Free software